Spasmodic Geyser is a geyser located in the Upper Geyser Basin in Yellowstone National Park in the United States.

Water can also erupt from a few inches to ten feet high from the approximately 20 vents. The intervals between eruptions are irregular, but most are in the 1-3 hour range. Spasmodic Geyser was named by A.C. Peale, from the 1878 Hayden survey team, for its erratic eruptions. Spasmodic Geyser is also connected to the nearby Penta Geyser, which is smaller. While Penta Geyser is erupting, there is no activity from Spasmodic Geyser. Activity from Spasmodic Geyser usually precede eruptions from Sawmill Geyser and Penta Geyser.

See also
List of Yellowstone geothermal features

References

External links

Geothermal features of Yellowstone National Park
Geysers of Wyoming
Geothermal features of Teton County, Wyoming
Geysers of Teton County, Wyoming